The Last Billboard was a public art billboard in Pittsburgh, Pennsylvania. The art piece consisted of a 12-feet-by-36-feet steel frame billboard on which letters were arranged. Each month, artists were solicited to place a message on the billboard. It was curated by Jon Rubin. The billboard was located at the intersection of Highland Avenue and Baum Boulevard in the East Liberty neighborhood, above what was originally the building for Waffle Shop: A Reality Show, a restaurant that was also conceptualized by Jon Rubin.

Schedule of guest artists

2013

2014

2015

2016

2017

2018

Controversy
In March 2018, The Last Billboard's landlord, We Do Property, in response to complaints from community members who felt the sign was racist, removed Alisha Wormsley's text from the billboard.  Jon Rubin, the billboard's founder and creator, responded in a statement in response to the removal:

A public panel discussion about the text and its removal was hosted by the Kelly Strayhorn Theater in April or May 2018.

In April of 2018, The Last Billboard was removed.

Early billboard messages 
From mid-2009 to late 2012, while Waffle Shop was still operating, the billboard included content proposed and submitted by artists and regular people. Unlike the version of the billboard from 2013 onward, this early version switched out messages several times a month. Below is an in-depth, but not comprehensive, list of those messages.

2009

2010

2011

2012

References

External links
 Official homepage

Billboards
Culture of Pittsburgh
Individual signs in the United States